Eucalyptus elaeophloia, commonly known as Nunniong gum or olive mallee, is a species of tree or mallee that is endemic to a restricted area in Victoria. It has mostly smooth greenish to greyish bark, glossy green, lance-shaped adult leaves, flower buds in groups of three, white flowers and conical or hemispherical fruit.

Description
It has smooth greenish to greyish bark, sometimes with rough bark at the base. Flowering occurs in March and the flowers are white.

Taxonomy and naming
Eucalyptus elaeophloia was first formally described in 1990 by Jennifer Chappill, Michael Crisp and Suzanne Prober in the journal Australian Systematic Botany. The type material was collected in 1987 from Brumby Point in the Alpine National Park. The specific epithet (elaeophloia) is derived from the ancient Greek word elaia meaning "olive", referring to the greenish colour of the bark.

This species is closely related to Eucalyptus imlayensis which occurs in New South Wales.

Distribution
Nunniong gum is only known from the Nunniong Plateau.

Due to widespread bushfires in 2003, the known habitat of the species was completely burnt, however most individuals have since resprouted from trunks and lignotubers.

Conservation status
This species is listed as "vulnerable" on the Department of Sustainability and Environment's Advisory List of Rare Or Threatened Plants In Victoria.

See also
List of Eucalyptus species

References

Flora of Victoria (Australia)
Trees of Australia
elaeophloia
Myrtales of Australia
Plants described in 1990
Taxa named by Michael Crisp
Taxa named by Suzanne Mary Prober